Vanderlin Island is an island in the Gulf of Carpentaria, Northern Territory, Australia. It is the largest island in the Sir Edward Pellew Group. The island is part of the traditional lands of the Walu people.

The only settlements on the island are four family outstations along the west coast. They are, from north to south:
Mooloowa
Babungi
Yulbara
Uguie

Exact population figures are not known, but family outstations are typically four to six people, which results in a population of approximately 20 for the whole island. In 2019 only one family (Smith) of five persons lives on Vanderlin Island.

Illustrations

See also
List of islands of Australia

References

Islands of the Northern Territory
Gulf of Carpentaria